An ADE model is a genetic model for twin studies which includes dominance genetic effects. Biometrical genetic modeling of twin or other family data can be used to decompose the variance of an observed response or phenotype into genetic and environmental components. Convenient parametrizations requiring few random effects allow such models to be estimated using widely available software for linear mixed models (continuous phenotypes) or generalized linear mixed models (categorical phenotypes). 

A stands for additive genetic effects, D for non-additive genetic (or dominance) effects, and E for nonshared environment effects.

See also
ACE model

References

Twin studies
Quantitative genetics